Alexander Vadimovich Izosimov (born January 10, 1964 in Yakutsk, Yakut ASSR, Russian SFSR, Soviet Union) is a Russian businessman who is noted for being the CEO of Vimpelcom between October 2003 and May 2011.

Career
Before 1996, Izosimov was with McKinsey & Co in Stockholm, Moscow and London.

From 2001 until 2003, he was a member of the Global Executive Management Board and Regional President for the CIS, Central Europe, and Nordic regions.

From 1996 to 2001, he was General Manager at Mars, Inc. for Russia and the CIS.

Izosimov VimpelCom, Russia's Chair for the Global Agenda Council on the Future of Mobile Communications between October 2003 and May 2011.

Currently he serves on the Boards of Directors of GSM Association, Baltika Breweries Plc, and United Confectioneries B.V.

Education
Izosimov graduated from the Moscow Aviation Institute with an M.S. degree in 1987 and holds an MBA from INSEAD.

Other
Izosimov bought the most expensive house in Sweden 2008, in a suburb to Stockholm. He paid 45 million Swedish kronor (5 million euro) for this house.

External links 
Official website of Vimpelcom.  Profile of Alexander Izosimov

References

Living people
1964 births
Moscow Aviation Institute alumni
Russian businesspeople
INSEAD alumni
VEON
PJSC VimpelCom
Businesspeople in telecommunications
People from Yakutsk